The following Confederate States Army units and commanders fought in the Battle of Ball's Bluff of the American Civil War, fought from October 20 to October 24, 1861 in Loudoun County, Virginia, also known as the Battle of Leesburg or the Battle of Harrison's Island.  The Union order of battle is shown separately.

Abbreviations used

Military rank
 GEN = General
 LG = Lieutenant General
 MG = Major General
 BG = Brigadier General
 Col = Colonel
 Ltc = Lieutenant Colonel
 Maj = Major
 Cpt = Captain
 Lt = Lieutenant
 Bvt = Brevet Rank

Other
 w = wounded
 mw = mortally wounded
 k = killed

Confederate Forces Around Ball’s Bluff and Edwards’ Ferry
Col Nathan “Shanks” Evans

Army of the Potomac
GEN Joseph E. Johnston (not present)

References

Notes

American Civil War orders of battle
Loudoun County in the American Civil War